Bahramabad (also Romanized as Bahrāmābād) is a village in Ganjabad Rural District, Esmaili District, Anbarabad County, Kerman Province, Iran. As of the 2006 census, its population was 393 with there being 88 families.

References 

Populated places in Anbarabad County